

Days of the month

31 December 2012 (Monday)

American football
NCAA bowl games (BCS standings in brackets):
Music City Bowl in Nashville, Tennessee: Vanderbilt 38, NC State 24.
Sun Bowl in El Paso, Texas: Georgia Tech 21, USC 7.
Liberty Bowl in Memphis, Tennessee: Tulsa 31, Iowa State 17.
Chick-fil-A Bowl in Atlanta, Georgia: [14] Clemson 25, [8] LSU 24.

30 December 2012 (Sunday)

American Football
NFL, Week 17:
In Denver, Colorado: Denver Broncos 38, Kansas City Chiefs 3.
The Broncos, already won the AFC West title, clinch the conference's No. 1 seed to earn home-field advantage throughout the AFC playoffs and first round bye.
The Chiefs finish their season with 2–14 record, and win the right to the first overall pick in the 2013 Draft.
In Foxborough, Massachusetts: New England Patriots 28, Miami Dolphins 0.
The Patriots, winner of the AFC East, get the conference's No. 2 seed and wrap up a first round bye in the AFC playoffs.
In Indianapolis, Indiana: Indianapolis Colts 28, Houston Texans 16.
With wins by the Broncos and Patriots, the AFC South champion Texans fall to the conference's No. 3 seed and will host the Cincinnati Bengals in the first round of the playoffs.
In Cincinnati, Ohio: Cincinnati Bengals 23, Baltimore Ravens 17.
The Ravens, the AFC North winner and conference's No. 4 seed, will face off with the Colts in the first round of the playoffs.
In San Francisco, California: San Francisco 49ers 27, Arizona Cardinals 13.
The 49ers grab the NFC West title, and clinch the conference's No. 2 seed to gain a first round bye in the NFC playoffs.
In Minneapolis, Minnesota: Minnesota Vikings 37, Green Bay Packers 34.
The NFC North champion Packers fail to get the conference's No. 2 seed as the Vikings secure an NFC Wild Card spot, and they have to contend with each other again in the first round of the playoffs.
Sunday Night Football in Landover, Maryland: Washington Redskins 28, Dallas Cowboys 18.
The Redskins claim their first NFC East title since 1999, and get the conference's No. 4 seed to host the Seattle Seahawks in the first round of the playoffs.
In Detroit, Michigan: Chicago Bears 26, Detroit Lions 24.
The Bears' victory eliminates the New York Giants, the reigning Super Bowl champion, from postseason action. Thus for the eighth consecutive year, the Vince Lombardi Trophy will have a new owner who will be crowned the new Super Bowl champion.

Cricket
Pakistan in India:
1st ODI in Chennai:  227/6 (50.0 overs);  228/4 (48.1 overs). Pakistan win by 6 wickets; lead 3-match series 1–0.

Cross-country skiing
Tour de Ski:
Stage 2 in Oberhof, Germany:
Men's 15 km Classic Pursuit:  Maxim Vylegzhanin   Alexander Legkov   Petter Northug 
Tour de Ski standings (after 2 of 7 races): (1) Vylegzhanin 47:45.7 (2) Legkov +5.1 (3) Northug +16.5
Women's 9 km Classic Pursuit:  Justyna Kowalczyk   Therese Johaug   Anne Kyllönen 
Tour de Ski standings (after 2 of 7 races): (1) Kowalczyk 31:59.5 (2) Johaug +46.4 (3) Kyllönen +55.0

Ski jumping
Four Hills Tournament:
Stage 1, HS 137 in Oberstdorf, Germany:  Anders Jacobsen   Gregor Schlierenzauer   Severin Freund

29 December 2012 (Saturday)

Alpine skiing
Men's World Cup:
Downhill in Bormio, Italy:  Hannes Reichelt  and Dominik Paris   Aksel Lund Svindal 
Overall standings (after 14 of 36 races): (1) Svindal 674 points (2) Marcel Hirscher  560 (3) Ted Ligety  537
Downhill standings (after 4 of 9 races): (1) Svindal 285 points (2) Paris 193 (3) Klaus Kröll  141
Women's World Cup:
Slalom in Semmering, Austria:  Veronika Zuzulová   Kathrin Zettel   Tina Maze 
Overall standings (after 16 of 37 races): (1) Maze 1059 points (2) Maria Höfl-Riesch  632 (3) Zettel 582
Slalom standings (after 4 of 11 races): (1) Maze 230 points (2) Höfl-Riesch 224 (3) Zuzulová 205

American football
NCAA bowl games (BCS standings in brackets):
Armed Forces Bowl in Fort Worth, Texas: Rice 33, Air Force 14.
Pinstripe Bowl in Bronx, New York: Syracuse 38, West Virginia 14.
Kraft Fight Hunger Bowl in San Francisco, California: Arizona State 62, Navy 28.
Alamo Bowl in San Antonio, Texas: [23] Texas 31, [13] Oregon State 27.
Buffalo Wild Wings Bowl in Tempe, Arizona: Michigan State 17, TCU 16.

Cross-country skiing
Tour de Ski:
Stage 1 in Oberhof, Germany:
Men's 4.0 km Freestyle Sprint:  Petter Northug   Marcus Hellner   Alexander Legkov 
Women's 3.1 km Freestyle Sprint:  Kikkan Randall   Charlotte Kalla   Justyna Kowalczyk

Mixed martial arts
UFC 155 in Las Vegas, Nevada, United States (USA unless stated):
Middleweight bout: Derek Brunson def. Chris Leben via unanimous decision (29–28, 29–28, 29–28)
Middleweight bout: Yushin Okami  def. Alan Belcher via unanimous decision (30–27, 30–27, 29–28)
Middleweight bout: Costas Philippou  def. Tim Boetsch via TKO (punches)
Lightweight bout: Jim Miller def. Joe Lauzon via unanimous decision (29–28, 29–28, 29–28)
Heavyweight Championship bout: Cain Velasquez def. Junior dos Santos  (c) via unanimous decision (50–45, 50–43, 50–44)

28 December 2012 (Friday)

Alpine skiing
Women's World Cup:
Giant Slalom in Semmering, Austria:  Anna Fenninger   Tina Maze   Tessa Worley 
Overall standings (after 15 of 37 races): (1) Maze 999 points (2) Maria Höfl-Riesch  582 (3) Kathrin Zettel  502
Giant Slalom standings (after 6 of 9 races): (1) Maze 540 points (2) Zettel 342 (3) Viktoria Rebensburg  301

American football
NCAA bowl games:
Independence Bowl in Shreveport, Louisiana: Ohio 45, Louisiana–Monroe 14.
Russell Athletic Bowl in Orlando, Florida: Virginia Tech 13, Rutgers 10 (OT).
Meineke Car Care Bowl of Texas in Houston, Texas: Texas Tech 34, Minnesota 31.

Cricket
Pakistan in India:
2nd T20I in Ahmedabad:  192/5 (20.0 overs);  181/7 (20.0 overs). India win by 11 runs; 2-match series drawn 1–1.

27 December 2012 (Thursday)

American football
NCAA bowl games (BCS standings in brackets):
Military Bowl in Washington, D.C.: [24] San Jose State 29, Bowling Green 20.
Belk Bowl in Charlotte, North Carolina: Cincinnati 48, Duke 34.
Holiday Bowl in San Diego: Baylor 49, [17] UCLA 26.

26 December 2012 (Wednesday)

American football
NCAA bowl games:
Little Caesars Pizza Bowl in Detroit: Central Michigan 24, Western Kentucky 21.

25 December 2012 (Tuesday)

Basketball
NBA Christmas games:
In Brooklyn, New York: Boston Celtics 93, Brooklyn Nets 76.
In Los Angeles, California: Los Angeles Lakers 100, New York Knicks 94.
In Miami, Florida: Miami Heat 103, Oklahoma City Thunder 97.
In Chicago, Illinois: Houston Rockets 120, Chicago Bulls 97.
In Los Angeles, California: Los Angeles Clippers 112, Denver Nuggets 100.

Cricket
Pakistan in India:
1st T20I in Bangalore:  133/9 (20.0 overs);  134/5 (19.4 overs). Pakistan win by 5 wickets; lead 2-match series 1–0.

24 December 2012 (Monday)

American football
NCAA bowl games:
Hawaii Bowl in Honolulu, Hawaii: SMU 43, Fresno State 10.

23 December 2012 (Sunday)

American football
NFL, Week 16:
In Kansas City, Missouri: Indianapolis Colts 20, Kansas City Chiefs 13.
The Colts secure an AFC Wild Card spot, and advance to the first round of the playoffs.
In Pittsburgh, Pennsylvania: Cincinnati Bengals 13, Pittsburgh Steelers 10.
The Bengals also secure an AFC Wild Card spot, and advance to the first round of the playoffs.
In Houston, Texas: Minnesota Vikings 23, Houston Texans 6.
The Vikings' victory eliminates the New Orleans Saints, the host team for Super Bowl XLVII, from postseason action and fail to reverse the Home Field Curse.

22 December 2012 (Saturday)

American football
NFL, Week 16:
Monday Night Football in Detroit, Michigan: Atlanta Falcons 31, Detroit Lions 18.
The Falcons, already won the NFC South title, clinch the conference's No. 1 seed to earn home-field advantage throughout the NFC playoffs and first round bye.
Despite losing the game, Lions wide receiver Calvin Johnson breaks NFL's single-season receiving yardage record, that has been held by Jerry Rice who gained 1,848 yards in 1995.
NCAA bowl games (BCS standings in brackets):
New Orleans Bowl in New Orleans, Louisiana: Louisiana–Lafayette 43, East Carolina 34.
Maaco Bowl Las Vegas in Whitney, Nevada: [19] Boise State 28, Washington 26.

21 December 2012 (Friday)

American football
NCAA bowl games:
Beef 'O' Brady's Bowl in St. Petersburg, Florida: UCF 38, Ball State 17.

20 December 2012 (Thursday)

Alpine skiing
Women's World Cup:
Slalom in Åre, Sweden:  Mikaela Shiffrin   Frida Hansdotter   Tina Maze 
Overall standings (after 14 of 37 races): (1) Maze 919 points (2) Maria Höfl-Riesch  532 (3) Kathrin Zettel  466
Slalom standings (after 3 of 11 races): (1) Shiffrin 196 points (2) Höfl-Riesch 174 (3) Maze 170

American football
NCAA bowl games:
Poinsettia Bowl in San Diego, California: BYU 23, San Diego State 6.

19 December 2012 (Wednesday)

Alpine skiing
Women's World Cup:
Giant Slalom in Åre, Sweden:  Viktoria Rebensburg   Anna Fenninger   Tina Maze 
Overall standings (after 13 of 37 races): (1) Maze 859 points (2) Maria Höfl-Riesch  508 (3) Kathrin Zettel  466
Giant Slalom standings (after 5 of 9 races): (1) Maze 460 points (2) Zettel 306 (3) Rebensburg 256

18 December 2012 (Tuesday)

Alpine skiing
Men's World Cup:
Slalom in Madonna di Campiglio, Italy:  Marcel Hirscher   Felix Neureuther   Naoki Yuasa 
Overall standings (after 13 of 36 races): (1) Aksel Lund Svindal  614 points (2) Hirscher 560 (3) Ted Ligety  537
Slalom standings (after 3 of 11 races): (1) Hirscher 240 points (2) André Myhrer  200 (3) Neureuther 196

17 December 2012 (Monday)

16 December 2012 (Sunday)

Alpine skiing
Men's World Cup:
Giant Slalom in Alta Badia, Italy:  Ted Ligety   Marcel Hirscher   Thomas Fanara 
Overall standings (after 12 of 36 races): (1) Aksel Lund Svindal  614 points (2) Ligety 508 (3) Hirscher 460
Giant Slalom standings (after 4 of 8 races): (1) Ligety 360 points (2) Hirscher 320 (3) Manfred Mölgg  162
Women's World Cup:
Giant Slalom in Courchevel, France:  Tina Maze   Kathrin Zettel   Tessa Worley 
Overall standings (after 12 of 37 races): (1) Maze 799 points (2) Maria Höfl-Riesch  468 (3) Zettel 440
Giant Slalom standings (after 4 of 9 races): (1) Maze 400 points (2) Zettel 280 (3) Worley 160

American football
NFL, Week 15:
Bills Toronto Series in Toronto, Canada: Seattle Seahawks 50, Buffalo Bills 17.
Seahawks become the third team in NFL history to score more than 50 points in consecutive games of the same season, joining the Los Angeles Rams and New York Giants, both in 1950.

Baseball
Australian Baseball League All-Star Game in Melbourne: Team Australia 6, World All-Stars 4.

Nordic combined
World Cup:
HS 98 / 10 km in Ramsau, Austria:  Mikko Kokslien   Jason Lamy-Chappuis   Mario Stecher 
Standings (after 5 of 17 races): (1) Lamy-Chappuis 355 points (2) Magnus Moan  323 (3) Bernhard Gruber  200

15 December 2012 (Saturday)

Alpine skiing
Men's World Cup:
Downhill in Val Gardena, Italy:  Steven Nyman   Rok Perko   Erik Guay 
Overall standings (after 11 of 36 races): (1) Aksel Lund Svindal  585 points (2) Ted Ligety  408 (3) Marcel Hirscher  380
Downhill standings (after 3 of 9 races): (1) Svindal 225 points (2) Kjetil Jansrud  139 (3) Guay 116
Women's World Cup:
Super Giant Slalom in Val-d'Isère, France: Cancelled due to heavy snow.

American football
NCAA bowl games (BCS standings in brackets):
New Mexico Bowl in Albuquerque, New Mexico: Arizona 49, Nevada 48.
Famous Idaho Potato Bowl in Boise, Idaho: [22] Utah State 41, Toledo 15.

Mixed martial arts
UFC on FX: Sotiropoulos vs. Pearson in Gold Coast, Australia:
Middleweight bout: Hector Lombard  def. Rousimar Palhares  via TKO (punches)
Lightweight bout: Norman Parke  def. Colin Fletcher  via unanimous decision (30–27, 29–28, 29–28)
Welterweight bout: Robert Whittaker  def. Brad Scott  via unanimous decision (29–28, 29–28, 29–28)
Lightweight bout: Ross Pearson  def. George Sotiropoulos  via TKO (punches)
The Ultimate Fighter: Team Carwin vs. Team Nelson Finale in Las Vegas, Nevada, United States (USA unless stated):
Featherweight bout: Dustin Poirier def. Jonathan Brookins via submission (d'arce choke)
Heavyweight bout: Pat Barry def. Shane del Rosario via KO (punches)
Welterweight bout: Colton Smith def. Mike Ricci  via unanimous decision (30–27, 30–27, 30–26)
Heavyweight bout: Roy Nelson def. Matt Mitrione via TKO (punches)

Nordic combined
World Cup:
HS 98 / 10 km in Ramsau, Austria:  Magnus Moan   Mikko Kokslien   Fabian Riessle 
Standings (after 4 of 17 races): (1) Moan 313 points (2) Jason Lamy-Chappuis  275 (3) Bernhard Gruber  168

14 December 2012 (Friday)

Alpine skiing
Men's World Cup:
Super Giant Slalom in Val Gardena, Italy:  Aksel Lund Svindal   Matteo Marsaglia   Werner Heel 
Overall standings (after 10 of 36 races): (1) Svindal 540 points (2) Ted Ligety  408 (3) Marcel Hirscher  380
Super Giant Slalom standings (after 3 of 6 races): (1) Svindal 280 points (2) Marsaglia 209 (3) Heel 150
Women's World Cup:
Downhill in Val-d'Isère, France:  Lara Gut   Leanne Smith   Nadja Kamer 
Overall standings (after 11 of 37 races): (1) Tina Maze  699 points (2) Maria Höfl-Riesch  463 (3) Lindsey Vonn  414
Downhill standings (after 3 of 8 races): (1) Vonn 200 points (2) Stacey Cook  186 (3) Gut 124

13 December 2012 (Thursday)

12 December 2012 (Wednesday)

11 December 2012 (Tuesday)

10 December 2012 (Monday)

9 December 2012 (Sunday)

Alpine skiing
Men's World Cup:
Giant Slalom in Val-d'Isère, France:  Marcel Hirscher   Stefan Luitz   Ted Ligety 
Overall standings (after 9 of 36 races): (1) Aksel Lund Svindal  440 points (2) Ligety 402 (3) Hirscher 380
Giant Slalom standings (after 3 of 8 races): (1) Ligety 260 points (2) Hirscher 240 (3) Manfred Mölgg  150
Women's World Cup:
Giant Slalom in St. Moritz, Switzerland:  Tina Maze   Viktoria Rebensburg   Tessa Worley 
Overall standings (after 10 of 37 races): (1) Maze 677 points (2) Maria Höfl-Riesch  443 (3) Lindsey Vonn  414
Giant Slalom standings (after 3 of 9 races): (1) Maze 300 points (2) Kathrin Zettel  200 (3) Rebensburg 140

8 December 2012 (Saturday)

Alpine skiing
Men's World Cup:
Slalom in Val-d'Isère, France:  Alexis Pinturault   Felix Neureuther   Marcel Hirscher 
Overall standings (after 8 of 36 races): (1) Aksel Lund Svindal  400 points (2) Ted Ligety  342 (3) Hirscher 280
Slalom standings (after 2 of 11 races): (1) André Myhrer  150 points (2) Hirscher 140 (3) Neureuther 116
Women's World Cup:
Super Giant Slalom in St. Moritz, Switzerland:  Lindsey Vonn   Tina Maze   Julia Mancuso 
Overall standings (after 9 of 37 races): (1) Maze 577 points (2) Maria Höfl-Riesch  414 (3) Vonn 410
Super Giant Slalom standings (after 2 of 7 races): (1) Vonn 200 points (2) Mancuso 140 (3) Maze 130

American football
NCAA Division I FBS:
Army–Navy Game in Philadelphia, Pennsylvania: Navy 17, Army 13.

Mixed martial arts
UFC on Fox: Henderson vs. Diaz in Seattle, Washington, United States (USA unless stated):
Welterweight bout: Matt Brown def. Mike Swick via KO (punches)
Welterweight bout: Rory MacDonald  def. B.J. Penn via unanimous decision (30–26, 30–26, 30–27)
Light Heavyweight bout: Alexander Gustafsson  def. Maurício Rua  via unanimous decision (30–27, 30–27, 30–26)
Lightweight Championship bout: Benson Henderson (c) def. Nate Diaz via unanimous decision (50–43, 50–45, 50–45)

7 December 2012 (Friday)

Alpine skiing
Women's World Cup:
Super Combined in St. Moritz, Switzerland:  Tina Maze   Nicole Hosp   Kathrin Zettel 
Overall standings (after 8 of 37 races): (1) Maze 497 points (2) Maria Höfl-Riesch  369 (3) Zettel 320

6 December 2012 (Thursday)

Rugby union
The Varsity Match in London, England: Oxford University 26–19 Cambridge University

5 December 2012 (Wednesday)

Basketball
NBA:
In New Orleans, Louisiana: Los Angeles Lakers 103, New Orleans Hornets 87.
Lakers guard Kobe Bryant becomes the fifth and youngest player in NBA history to score 30,000 career points.

4 December 2012 (Tuesday)

3 December 2012 (Monday)

2 December 2012 (Sunday)

Alpine skiing
Men's World Cup:
Giant Slalom in Beaver Creek, United States:  Ted Ligety   Marcel Hirscher   Davide Simoncelli 
Overall standings (after 7 of 36 races): (1) Aksel Lund Svindal  400 points (2) Ligety 320 (3) Hirscher 220
Giant Slalom standings (after 2 of 8 races): (1) Ligety 200 points (2) Hirscher 140 (3) Manfred Mölgg  130
Women's World Cup:
Super Giant Slalom in Lake Louise, Canada:  Lindsey Vonn   Julia Mancuso   Anna Fenninger 
Overall standings (after 7 of 37 races): (1) Tina Maze  397 points (2) Maria Höfl-Riesch  319 (3) Vonn 310

Nordic combined
World Cup:
HS 142 / Team sprint in Kuusamo, Finland:  Bernhard Gruber/Mario Stecher   Håvard Klemetsen/Mikko Kokslien   Sébastien Lacroix/Jason Lamy-Chappuis

1 December 2012 (Saturday)

Alpine skiing
Men's World Cup:
Super Giant Slalom in Beaver Creek, United States:  Matteo Marsaglia   Aksel Lund Svindal   Hannes Reichelt 
Overall standings (after 6 of 36 races): (1) Svindal 360 points (2) Ted Ligety  220 (3) Kjetil Jansrud  159
Super Giant Slalom standings (after 2 of 6 races): (1) Svindal 180 points (2) Marsaglia 129 (3) Ligety 100
Women's World Cup:
Downhill in Lake Louise, Canada:  Lindsey Vonn   Stacey Cook   Marianne Kaufmann-Abderhalden 
Overall standings (after 6 of 37 races): (1) Tina Maze  347 points (2) Maria Höfl-Riesch  274 (3) Kathrin Zettel  260
Downhill standings (after 2 of 8 races): (1) Vonn 200 points (2) Cook 160 (3) Höfl-Riesch 100

American football
NCAA Division I FBS (BCS standings in brackets):
Conference championship games:
C-USA Championship Game in Tulsa, Oklahoma: Tulsa 33, UCF 27 (OT).
SEC Championship Game in Atlanta, Georgia: [2] Alabama 32, [3] Georgia 28.
Alabama advances to the BCS National Championship Game against [1] Notre Dame.
ACC Championship Game in Charlotte, North Carolina: [13] Florida State 21, Georgia Tech 15.
Big Ten Championship Game in Indianapolis, Indiana: Wisconsin 70, [12] Nebraska 31.
Other games:
In Fort Worth, Texas: [11] Oklahoma 24, TCU 17.
In Manhattan, Kansas: [6] Kansas State 42, [18] Texas 24.
Oklahoma and Kansas State claim a share of the Big 12 championship, with Kansas State winning the tiebreaker for the BCS berth.
In East Hartford, Connecticut: Cincinnati 34, Connecticut 17.
Cincinnati shares the Big East title with Louisville, Rutgers and Syracuse.
In Reno, Nevada: [20] Boise State 27, Nevada 21.
Boise State shares the MWC title with Fresno State and San Diego State.
In Jonesboro, Arkansas: Arkansas State 45, Middle Tennessee 0.
Arkansas State wins the Sun Belt championship for the second consecutive year.

Nordic combined
World Cup:
HS 142 / 10 km in Kuusamo, Finland:  Jason Lamy-Chappuis   Magnus Krog   Sébastien Lacroix 
Standings (after 3 of 17 races): (1) Lamy-Chappuis 230 points (2) Magnus Moan  213 (3) Håvard Klemetsen  141

Rugby union
End of year tests, Week 5:
In London, England:  38–21 
In Cardiff, Wales:  12–14

References

XII
December 2012 sports events